Events in the year 1930 in Bulgaria.

Incumbents

Events 

 October 4 – Tsar Boris III married Giovanna of Savoy.

References 

 
1930s in Bulgaria
Years of the 20th century in Bulgaria
Bulgaria
Bulgaria